W. R. Humphries is an American politician who served as the New Mexico Commissioner of Public Lands from 1987 to 1990.

Background 
Humphries is a native of New Mexico. A member of the Republican Party, he has worked as a rancher and community advocate. In 2017, Humphries authored an op-ed for The Santa Fe New Mexican, advocating for Public Lands Commissioner Aubrey Dunn Jr.'s proposal to establish the Early Childhood Land Grant Permanent Fund. He lives in Quay County, New Mexico.

References 

New Mexico Republicans
Ranchers from New Mexico
New Mexico Commissioners of Public Lands
People from Quay County, New Mexico
Living people
Year of birth missing (living people)